Oujan (also Romanized as Owjān; also known as Ojān) is a village in Shakhen Rural District, in the Central District of Birjand County, South Khorasan Province, Iran. At the 2016 census, its population was 834, in 238 families.

References 

Populated places in Birjand County